Marvin Lou Cohen (born March 3, 1935) is an American theoretical physicist. He is a University Professor of Physics at the University of California, Berkeley. Cohen is a leading expert in the field of Condensed Matter Physics. He is highly cited and most widely known for his seminal work on the electronic structure of solids.

Early life and education 

Cohen was born in Montreal, Quebec, Canada. His parents Elmo and Molly (Zaritsky) Cohen were both born in Montreal and his grandparents, all of Jewish descent, emigrated to Canada from the Baltic States and Russia. He, together with his parents and younger brother, Gordon, moved to San Francisco, CA in 1947 where he attended Roosevelt Junior High School and George Washington High School. He was naturalized a U.S. citizen, November, 1953.  He attended the University of California, Berkeley (A.B. in physics, 1957) and the University of Chicago (M.S. in physics 1958 and Ph.D. in physics completed 1963, conferred 1964). His Ph.D. thesis advisor was James C. Phillips.

Career 

From 1963 to 1964, Cohen was a Member of the Technical Staff with a postdoctoral position in the theoretical physics group at Bell Laboratories, Murray Hill, N.J. where his mentors were primarily Philip W. Anderson and Conyers Herring. He joined the faculty of the University of California in 1964 (Assistant Professor of Physics 1964–66; Associate Professor 1966–69; Professor 1969–1995; University Professor 1995–present; Professor of the Graduate School, 2010–present.) He supervised approximately fifty graduate students and fifty postdoctoral researchers since 1964. He was President of the American Physical Society in 2005.

Awards and honors 

Alfred P. Sloan Fellow, 1965–67. Elected Fellow of the American Physical Society, 1969. Guggenheim Fellow, 1978–79, 1990–91. Oliver E. Buckley Prize for Solid State Physics (American Physical Society), 1979.  Elected to the National Academy of Sciences, 1980.  U.S. Department of Energy Award for Outstanding Accomplishment in Solid State Physics, 1981,1990. Elected to the American Academy of Arts and Sciences, 1993.  Julius Edgar Lilienfeld Prize of the American Physical Society, 1994. Outstanding Performance Award, Lawrence Berkeley Laboratory, 1995. Faculty Research Lecturer, University of California at Berkeley, 1996–97.  Elected Fellow, American Association for the Advancement of Science,1997.  2001 National Medal of Science (Presidential award, 2002).  Elected member, American Philosophical Society, 2003. Awarded (with Steven G. Louie) the 2003 Foresight Institute Richard P. Feynman Prize in Nanotechnology.  Awarded Doctorat Honoris Causa, University of Montreal, 2005.  Technology Pioneer Award from the World Economic Forum, 2007.  Berkeley Citation, University of California, 2011.  Dickson Prize in Science, 2012. Doctor of Science Honoris Causa, Hong Kong University of Science and Technology, 2013.  Doctor of Science Honoris Causa, Weizmann Institute of Science, 2014.  Von Hippel Award of the Materials Research Society, 2014. Thomson Reuters Citation Laureate, 2016. Benjamin Franklin Medal in Physics 2017.

Personal life 

Marvin Cohen is married to Suzy Locke Cohen who is an Art Advisor. Cohen and his late wife Merrill Leigh Gardner Cohen (deceased 1994) had a son Mark Cohen (born 1963) and a daughter Susan Cohen Crumpler (born 1965). His grandchildren are Jake Crumpler, Luke Crumpler, and Jessica Crumpler. Cohen has played the clarinet since age 13.

Research and publications

Background 

One of the most influential and broadest advances in the study of the physics of materials in the last fifty years is the use of computational tools to explain and predict properties of materials. Marvin Cohen has been honored for his creation of physical models and computational methods and applications that made a large fraction of these advances possible. This approach is often referred to as the “Standard Model” for computing properties of solids, and this work played an important part in the creation and development of the field of computational physics. The successful predictions of new materials and material properties have led to new insights in fundamental science, the production of useful materials, and the creative manipulations of known materials. An essential and standard tool is the availability of accurate electronic band structures for materials ranging from ceramics to metals, and the models and method mentioned above have made the use of electronic band structures and related calculations ubiquitous in pure and applied condensed matter physics.

Representative publications 
A complete list of 860 publications for Marvin Cohen is given at:  http://cohen.berkeley.edu

Description of the contributions described in the representative publications
In the list of selected representative publications (below), specific advances are reported in the following subareas of Condensed Matter Physics.

For electronic structure, in the mid 1960’s it became possible to use pseudopotentials for accurately computing band structures for 14 semiconductors at a time when little was known about their electronic structure. This advance was revolutionary as it explained optical properties of semiconductors in the visible and UV range and led to the first pictures of electron density and bonds in semiconductors. These results were later confirmed experimentally. This work also led to the creation of the field of surface calculations of electronic structure using the invention of the supercell. This was followed by the development of a total energy scheme which initiated a new era of first principles predictions of structural, vibrational, and high-pressure properties of solids using only atomic numbers and atomic masses as input.

For superconductivity, there were successes in the prediction of superconductivity in doped semiconductors, the prediction of the first superconducting oxide, and the confirmation of the ab initio proposed existence of two new high-pressure phases of silicon and their properties including the successful prediction of their superconducting properties.

In the area of nanostructures, it was shown that the methods used for calculating bulk and surfaces properties were applicable for studies of nanoscale materials such as C60, nanotubes, and other low dimensional structures. These studies led to the successful prediction of the existence the BN nanotube and its properties. Seminal studies were done explaining and predicting properties of graphene nanoribbons and their energy gaps, and the properties of layered systems of graphene and BN sheets were calculated suggesting a path for fabrication of useful electronic materials. The first theoretical and experimental studies of the electronic and vibrational properties of one-dimensional isolated chains were done, and the underlying physics was determined for controlling the size and shape of 2D nanopores with applications for DNA sequencing, sieving, and quantum emission. Another nanoscience contribution was an important study of the physics of metallic clusters using electronic energies to explain their size abundances, referred to as “magic numbers”

The methods developed for the above studies are numerous. Some examples include the Empirical Pseudopotential Method, ab initio pseudopotentials, supercells for surfaces and localized configurations, a method for calculating the total energy of solids, the creation of an empirical formula used to obtain the bulk moduli of many semiconductors and insulators, and the development of a method for calculating electron-phonon interactions using Wannier functions. These approaches and others first developed for this research are now used worldwide.

Selected journal articles 
 
 
 
 
 
  Erratum: 
  Erratum: 
 
 
 
  Erratum:

Selected books and book chapters 

M. L. Cohen, "Superconductivity in low-carrier-density systems: Degenerate semiconductors," in Superconductivity, ed. R. D. Parks. New York: Marcel Dekker, Inc., 1969. p. 615.

M. L. Cohen and V. Heine, "The fitting of pseudopotentials to experimental data and their subsequent application," in Solid State Physics, Vol. 24, eds. H. Ehrenreich, F. Seitz, and D. Turnbull. New York: Academic Press, 1970.  p. 37.

J. D. Joannopoulos and M. L. Cohen, "Theory of short-range order and disorder in tetrahedrally bonded semiconductors," in Solid State Physics, Vol. 31, eds. H. Ehrenreich, F. Seitz, and D. Turnbull (Academic Press, New York, 1976), p. 71.

M. L. Cohen, "Electrons at interfaces," in Advances in Electronics and Electron Physics, Vol. 51, eds. L. Marton and C. Marton. New York: Academic Press, 1980.  p. 1.

M. L. Cohen and J. R. Chelikowsky, "Pseudopotentials for semiconductors," in Handbook on Semiconductors, Vol. 1, ed. W. Paul. Amsterdam: North-Holland, 1982.  p. 219.

W. A. de Heer, W. D. Knight, M. Y. Chou, and M. L. Cohen, "Electronic shell structure and metal clusters," in Solid State Physics, Vol. 40, ed. H. Ehrenreich and D. Turnbull. New York: Academic Press, 1987. p. 93.

M. L. Cohen and J. R. Chelikowsky, Electronic Structure and Optical Properties of Semiconductors. Berlin: Springer-Verlag, 1988. TEXTBOOK.

M. L. Cohen, “Overview: A standard model of solids,” Conceptual Foundations of Materials: A Standard Model for Ground- and Excited-State Properties, vol. eds. S. G. Louie, M. L. Cohen, (Elsevier, Amsterdam, 2006) p. 1.

M. L. Cohen, “Emergence in condensed matter physics,” in Visions of Discovery: New Light on Physics, Cosmology, and Consciousness,” eds. R.Y. Chiao, M. L. Cohen, A.J. Leggett, W. D. Phillips, and C.L. Harper, Jr. (Cambridge University Press, Cambridge, 2010) p. 496.

M. L. Cohen, “Predicting and explaining Tc and other properties of BCS superconductors,” Modern Phys. Lett. B 24, 2755 (2010). Also in Bardeen, Cooper, and Schrieffer: 50 Years, eds. L.N. Cooper and D. Feldman (World Scientific, Singapore, 2010).

M. L. Cohen and S. G. Louie, Fundamentals of Condensed Matter Physics. Cambridge: Cambridge University Press, 2016. TEXTBOOK.
M. L.  Cohen, " Modeling solids and its impact on science and technology," Handbook of Materials Modeling, eds. W. Andreoni and S. Yip (Springer, Cham, Switzerland, 2018), p. 1.

Notes

External links
 Marvin L. Cohen Research Group
 Marvin L. Cohen's Faculty profile
 Oral history interview transcript with Marvin Cohen on 7 April 2020, American Institute of Physics, Niels Bohr Library & Archives
 2017 BENJAMIN FRANKLIN MEDAL
 2014 MRS VON HIPPEL AWARD
 2013 OPPENHEIMER LECTURE
 2011 DICKSON PRIZE LECTURE
 2001 NATIONAL MEDAL OF SCIENCE

1935 births
Living people
Academics from Montreal
Canadian expatriate academics in the United States
Fellows of the American Association for the Advancement of Science
Fellows of the American Physical Society
Members of the United States National Academy of Sciences
National Medal of Science laureates
Oliver E. Buckley Condensed Matter Prize winners
University of California, Berkeley College of Letters and Science faculty
University of Chicago alumni
Scientists from Montreal
20th-century American physicists
21st-century American physicists
UC Berkeley College of Letters and Science alumni
Members of the American Philosophical Society
Presidents of the American Physical Society